The Syro-Malabar Catholic Eparchy of Hosur-Mylapore is an Eastern Syriac Catholic eparchy headquartered in Tamil Nadu, India, under the Syro-Malabar Catholic Church. It was established by Pope Francis on 10 October 2017, and Mar Sebastian Pozholiparampil was appointed its first bishop.
The cathedral is St. Antony's Syro-Malabar Catholic Cathedral Church at Noothenchery and the bishop's chancellory is at St. Thomas Pastoral Centre Ayanavaram.

The Syro Malabar Church is not a language-based community. It is an Oriental (East Syriac Rite) Catholic church, in full communion with the Church of Rome.

Before the creation of this Eparchy, the Chennai Mission was founded in 1981 to serve the Syro-Malabar community in Chennai (Madras). Priests from the Eparchy of Irinjalakkuda volunteered their time to travel to Chennai to provide members who were present in the cities for work and studies.

Diocese of Hosur was blessed with a new priest, Fr. Shebin Chazhoor. He is from Perambur, St.Joseph Parish. He has completed his minor seminary at Irinjalakuda St.Paul's Minor Seminary. Later, he completed bph from Mary Matha Major Seminary, Thrissur. He took his BTh from Papal Seminary, Pune.

Parishes

Foranes and Parishes

1. Noothenchery Forane 
Noothenchery

Neelankarai

Gorimedu - Pondicherry

Jaya Nagar - Pondicherry

2. Keelkattalai Forane 
Keelkattalai

St. Thomas Mount

Pozhichallur

Velacherry

3. Mogappair Forane 
Mogappair

Valasaravakkam

Poonamallee

Athipet

Ambatur

4. Avadi Forane 
IAF Avadi

Kovilpathagai

Pattabiram

Vellore

5. Ayanavarm Forane 
Ayanavaram

Kodambakkam

Mylapore

Hosur

6. Perambur Forane 
Perambur

Thiruvottiyur

Eranavoor

Otteri

References

External links
Catholic-Hierarchy.org
GCatholic.org

Eastern Catholic dioceses in India
Syro-Malabar Catholic dioceses
Christianity in Tamil Nadu
2017 establishments in Tamil Nadu
Christian organizations established in 2017